Semblis is a genus of insects belonging to the family Phryganeidae.

Species:
 Semblis atrata
 Semblis phalaenoides

References

Phryganeidae
Trichoptera genera